Adrian Rodriguez also known by the name Rodriguez is a trance producer and DJ from Nordrhein-Westfalen Germany who debuted in 1994, pairing with Sash! to create hits such as "Ecuador" and "Adelante".

Discography

Featured in

References

External links

 
 Rodriguez last.fm
 16 Inch Records
 Blue Chip Records 
 Official JS16 site

Living people
Club DJs
German trance musicians
German DJs
Electronic dance music DJs
Year of birth missing (living people)